Victoria Luz Cartagena is an American theater, film, and television actress. Cartagena is known for her role as Zoe Lopez in The Bedford Diaries, and for portraying Renee Montoya as series regular in the first season of Gotham and the third season of Batwoman. She is additionally known for her recurring role as Lourdes in the NBC-turned-Netflix drama Manifest.

Early life
Cartagena was born in Philadelphia, Pennsylvania, the daughter of Victor and Lucy Cartagena. She attended Penn State University. Cartagena has starred in numerous theater productions and participated in various plays and workshops for New York's Lark Theater.

Career

Cartagena appeared on the WB television series The Bedford Diaries, NBC's Kidnapped, and the 2008 season finale of Law and Order: Special Victims Unit. She has appeared on several different TV shows throughout her career.

Cartagena appeared as Renee Montoya in the FOX TV series Gotham. In the first episode she was credited as recurring.  Cartagena would have a contract role starting in the second episode. She said in an interview with Lucia I. Suarez, “I’ve seen them all,” the actress told Fox News Latino, adding that she loved that there was a character Vicki Vale in the comics. “Everyone knows Batman.” In an interview with Graeme McMillan, "I feel lucky to be playing someone who’s so important," the actress tells THR. “She’s pretty amazing,” she tells The Hollywood Reporter. “I’m playing such an iconic character, and I feel lucky to be playing someone who’s so important to the [LGBTQ] community.” She states to Leeds in an interview, "I never read a comic before the show! But now, because I’m on the show, I really want to know everything about her. So I find myself reading comic books more and really enjoying them." Cartagena states about her gay character on Gotham, "I guess both. It’s definitely a straight-up fact of who she is as a person — she’s a woman, she’s a cop, she’s Latina, she’s gay. But that said, her perspective on things adds a voice to the conversation by virtue of her background that wouldn’t necessarily be there, or expected to be there." She states in the interview with Leeds, "I believe that Renee really did break it off because of her sobriety. And I believe that she really, really loves Barbara. But I think that Renee is at a point in her life where she is more self-aware than she ever was — and I don’t know if that’s because she’s gone through recovery — and she’s just willing to step away from the person that she loves in order to save herself. Because she’s been there with Barbara before, and it ended badly. So at least, at this point, she has the benefit of hindsight." In August 2015, it was reported that Cartagena would not be returning as a member of the main cast for season two.

Cartagena later made 2 guest appearances in Jessica Jones and had a recurring role in Manifest.

Cartagena later reprised Renee Montoya in season three of Batwoman. This depiction of Montoya is a former Gotham City Police Department member who left due to the corruption in some of its members.

Filmography

Film

Television

References

External links
 
 
 

American people of Latin American descent
American stage actresses
American television actresses
Penn State College of Education alumni
Actresses from Philadelphia
Living people
21st-century American actresses
American film actresses
Year of birth missing (living people)